Hans Christiansen (16 October 1867 – 20 July 1938) was a Norwegian sailor. He was born in Nesna, and was the father of Eigil Christiansen. He competed in the 6 metre class at the 1912 Summer Olympics in Stockholm, placing tied fifth with the boat Sonja II, together with Edvart Christensen and his son Eigil.

References

1867 births
1938 deaths
People from Nesna
Norwegian male sailors (sport)
Sailors at the 1912 Summer Olympics – 6 Metre
Olympic sailors of Norway
Sportspeople from Nordland